Maria Anna of Bavaria (21 March 1551, Munich – 29 April 1608, Graz) was a politically active Archduchess of Austria by her marriage to Archduke Charles II of Austria. She played an important role in the Counter-Reformation in Austria.

Life
Maria Anna was a daughter of Albert V, Duke of Bavaria and Anna of Austria. She was given an elementary education in Latin and religion but a high education in music, likely by Orlando di Lasso. 

On 26 August 1571 in Vienna, the 20-year-old Maria Anna married her maternal uncle Charles II of Austria. The marriage was arranged to give Austria political support from Bavaria and Bavaria an agent in Vienna. 

The relation between Maria Anna and Charles was described as good, and the couple had 15 children in just 18 years. Maria Anna was described as confident, ambitious and a great lover of pomp and power, but foremost a devout Catholic. She participated in affairs of state and successfully benefited a powerful counter reformation in the domains of her spouse. She continued her education in music, benefited the Jesuit school in Graz, and spent her time in worship and religious charity. 

Maria Anna was widowed in 1590, but she continued to participate in politics as an advisor to her son and encouraged him to continue the Counter-Reformation and work against the Protestant clergy and nobility. 

In 1608, she retired to the Nunnery of St Clare in Graz. 

Her correspondence is partially preserved.

Issue

Ancestry

Bibliography
 HAMANN, Brigitte, Die Habsburger: Ein Biografisches Lexicon (Munich: Piper, 1988).
 SÁNCHEZ, Magdalena, (2000) A Woman's Influence: Archduchess Maria of Bavaria and the Spanish Habsburgs. In C. Kent, T.K. Wolber, C.M.K. Hewitt  (Eds.) The lion and the eagle: interdisciplinary essays on German-Spanish relations over the centuries (pp. 91–107). New York: Berghahn Books.

References

 
 http://www.nad.riksarkivet.se/sbl/Presentation.aspx?id=18720
 http://de.wikisource.org/wiki/ADB:Maria_(Erzherzogin_von_%C3%96sterreich)
 http://de.wikisource.org/wiki/BLK%C3%96:Habsburg,_Maria_von_Bayern

House of Wittelsbach
1551 births
1608 deaths
Austrian royal consorts
Daughters of monarchs
16th-century German people
17th-century German people